Minder is a surname of Germanic origin.

People with the name
 Andy Minder (fl. 1907–1943), American jockey
 Erhard Minder (born 1925), Swiss Olympic athlete
 Hans Minder (fl. 1908–1928), Swiss Olympic wrestler
 Peter Minder (born 1956), Swiss Olympic athlete
 Thomas Minder (born 1960), Swiss entrepreneur and politician
 Walter Minder (1905–1992), Swiss mineralogist and chemist

See also
 Minder (disambiguation)

Germanic-language surnames